The Kemena River is a river in Bintulu Division, Sarawak state, Malaysia. It flows past Sebauh and Bintulu, and is used for transporting timber and oil from the interior.

See also
 List of rivers of Malaysia

References

Rivers of Sarawak
Rivers of Malaysia